Conspiracy of Hearts is a 1960 British Second World War film, directed by Ralph Thomas, about nuns in Italy smuggling Jewish children out of an internment camp near their convent to save them from The Holocaust. It stars Lilli Palmer, Sylvia Syms, Yvonne Mitchell and Ronald Lewis, and was nominated for a Golden Globe for Best Film Promoting International Understanding at the 18th Golden Globe Awards in 1961.

Plot
In 1943 Italy, nuns hide and protect Jewish children who have escaped from a concentration camp. The Italian camp has been taken over by  German forces with a colonel (Albert Lieven) and his sadistic lieutenant (Peter Arne) in command. When the colonel and lieutenant threaten to execute some of the nuns, including Mother Katharine (Lilli Palmer), for helping the Jewish children to escape, the Italian soldiers block the execution and shoot the Germans dead. The Italian soldiers then leave the camp to join Italian partisans in the nearby hills.

Cast
 Lilli Palmer as Mother Katharine 
 Sylvia Syms as Sister Mitya 
 Yvonne Mitchell as Sister Gerta 
 Ronald Lewis as Major Spoletti 
 Albert Lieven as Colonel Horsten
 Peter Arne as Lieutenant Schmidt 
 Nora Swinburne as Sister Tia 
 Michael Goodliffe as Father Desmaines
 Megs Jenkins as Sister Constance
 David Kossoff as the Rabbi
 Jenny Laird as Sister Honoria
 George Coulouris as Petrelli 
 Phyllis Neilson-Terry as Sister Elisaveta 
 Maureen Pryor as Sister Consuela

TV production
The film was originally a teleplay credited to Dale Pitt, a writer who was acting as a "front" for blacklisted Hollywood screenwriter Adrian Scott. This teleplay was set in 1946 and concerned nuns helping Jewish children to get to Palestine. It aired in 1956 as an episode of Goodyear Playhouse directed by Robert Mulligan.

Production
The film version was written by Robert Presnell Jr., who set the story in 1943. Presnell was reportedly a front for Dalton Trumbo. The script was optioned by Albert C. Gannaway in 1958, but he could not get financing to make the picture.

Betty Box became enthusiastic about the movie and wanted to make it. She took it to the Rank Organisation. Box says Rank did not want them to make the movie but allowed her because of the success of the Doctor in the House series. "They said, 'It's religion, it's nuns, it's wartime, who wants to know? Tell you what, make us another Doctor and you can do it!" Box and Thomas made Doctor in Love (1960) as a pay off for Rank financing the movie.

The film was shot on location in Italy and at Pinewood Studios in London. Some filming took place at La Certosa di Galluzzo monastery near Florence.

Reception
The film was a financial success, being the 5th most popular film at the British box office in 1960. (Doctor in Love was even more popular.) 

US rights were bought by Barney Balaban of Paramount. Thomas says Balaban paid the largest amount Rank had received for a picture until then.

Filmink magazine argued it was arguably the best film from the team of Ralph Thomas and Betty Box.

References

Box, Betty, Lifting the Lid, 2001

External links
 
  
 
 

1960 films
1960 drama films
British black-and-white films
British drama films
1960s English-language films
Films about Catholic nuns
Films about Catholicism
Films based on television plays
Films directed by Ralph Thomas
Films produced by Betty Box
Films set in Italy
Films shot at Pinewood Studios
Holocaust films
Paramount Pictures films
Films scored by Angelo Francesco Lavagnino
1960s British films